Cebuano singer Matteo Guidicelli has released two studio albums.

Guidicelli released his debut album Matteo Guidicelli in January 2015, which included the song "Ipapadama Na Lang".

Albums

Studio albums

Singles

As lead artist

References 

Discographies of Cebuano artists